Galtellì is a comune (municipality) in the Province of Nuoro in the Italian region Sardinia, located about  northeast of Cagliari and about  northeast of Nuoro.

Galtellì borders the municipalities of: Dorgali, Irgoli, Loculi, Lula, Onifai, Orosei.

Galtellì was a historic episcopal see, in the current diocese of Nuoro, in the territory of the ancient sentence of Gallura and, in particular, in the territory of the Baronie.

Galtellì has one of the better-preserved historic centres in Sardinia. It has numerous churches, and the cathedral of Saint Peter houses a cycle of Romanesque frescoes.

References

External links

 Official website 

Cities and towns in Sardinia